Professor Larousse is a 1920 German silent crime film directed by Mutz Greenbaum and starring Victor Colani, Erwin Fichtner and Erich Kaiser-Titz.

Cast
In alphabetical order
 Victor Colani 
 Erwin Fichtner 
 Erich Kaiser-Titz 
 Rolf Loer as Phantomas  
 Emmy Sturm

References

Bibliography
 Hans-Michael Bock and Tim Bergfelder. The Concise Cinegraph: An Encyclopedia of German Cinema. Berghahn Books, 2009.

External links

1920 films
Films of the Weimar Republic
Films directed by Mutz Greenbaum
German silent feature films
Fantômas films
German black-and-white films
German crime films
1920 crime films
1920s German films